South Dakota Highway 253 (SD 253) is an  state highway in the north-central part of the U.S. state of South Dakota. It exists entirely within Edmunds County, from U.S. Route 12 (US 12) west of Roscoe to SD 47 north of Bowdle. The route is maintained by the South Dakota Department of Transportation (SDDOT) and is not a part of the National Highway System.

Route description
SD 253 begins at an intersection with US 12 near Gretna and heads north through flat farmland. It passes a railroad almost immediately and continues north. The route passes by a couple of lakes and turns west. Directly after turning east, SD 253 enters the city of Hosmer. After running through the city, the highway passes by a cemetery and treks west.

SD 253 is maintained by SDDOT. In 2012, the traffic on the road was measured in average annual daily traffic. The highway had an average of 214 vehicles on the north–south segment and an average of 195 vehicles on the east–west segment. The designation is not a part of the National Highway System, a system of highways important to the nation's defense, economy, and mobility.

Major intersections

References

External links

The Unofficial South Dakota Highways Page

253
Transportation in Edmunds County, South Dakota